Viaje is a 2015 Costa Rican romance film directed and written by Paz Fábrega. It had its world premiere at the 2015 Tribeca Film Festival, where it met with positive reviews. The film is shot in black-and-white.

References

2015 films
2010s romance films
Costa Rican drama films
2010s Spanish-language films